Wu, also referred to as Huainan, Hongnong, Southern Wu, or Yang Wu (楊吳), was a dynastic state of China and one of the Ten Kingdoms during the Five Dynasties and Ten Kingdoms period. It existed from 907 to 937 with capital at Jiangdu Municipality (modern-day Yangzhou, Jiangsu Province).

Some historians consider Wu to have begun in 902, when Yang Xingmi was named Prince of Wu by the Tang dynasty. All three rulers of Wu after 907 (when the Tang dynasty collapsed and Zhu Wen established the Later Liang dynasty) were Yang Xingmi's sons. The first ruler Yang Wo was murdered by his ministers Xu Wen and Zhang Hao, and his two brothers after him were effectively puppets dominated by Xu Wen at first, and later Xu Wen's adopted son Xu Zhigao (Li Bian) who in 937 usurped power to establish the Southern Tang dynasty. Yang Pu, the last ruler, was the only one to claim the title of emperor; the other rulers were kings or princes.

Founding
The founder of Wu, Yang Xingmi, started his career as a volunteer soldier before seizing power in his home prefecture Luzhou in a military coup. The weak Tang court could only confirm his position. In 887 the governor of Huainan, Gao Pian, was captured by Bi Shiduo. Xingmi defeated Shiduo and captured the provincial capital Yangzhou later that year, but by then Pian had been put to death by Shiduo. Another rebel leader, Sun Ru had Shiduo killed and absorbed his forces. Yang Xingmi was forced to abandon Yangzhou and retreat to Luzhou. With Luzhou as his base, Xingmi increased his power by seizing neighbouring prefectures until he could recapture Yangzhou in 892. For this act, the Tang court granted him the military governorship of Huainan.

While still nominally loyal to the Tang dynasty, rival warlords were now carving out their own statelets. Yang Xingmi clashed with Zhu Wen of Later Liang in the north and Qian Liu of Wuyue in the south, successfully defending his territory. In 902 Yang Xingmi was named Prince of Wu by Emperor Zhaozong of Tang.

Independence

Yang Xingmi died in 905 and was succeeded by his oldest son Yang Wo. In 907 Zhu Wen forced the last Tang emperor to abdicate and proclaimed himself the first emperor of the Later Liang. Yang Wo refused to acknowledge this change and continued the use of the last era name of Tang. From this point Wu was an independent, sovereign entity.

Subversion of power by Xu Wen

Young and untested at his father's death Yang Wo had to rely on the director of the guard, Xu Wen, for his ascension, but later grew to resent Xu Wen's influence. However, before he could pull himself free, Yang Wo was assassinated by Xu Wen and his colleague Zhang Hao in 908. Wen and Hao had initially planned to divide Wu between themselves and submit to Liang, but they soon fell out. Xu Wen installed Yang Wo's younger brother Longyan and had Zhang Hao killed. Yang Longyan was a mere puppet with Xu Wen as the state's true ruler. Wen made himself Runzhou governor and moved his command to Jinling. The regular administration at the capital was left to his son Xu Zhixun. After Zhixun's murder in 918, this position was inherited by Wen's stepson, Zhigao. In 919, Yang Longyan proclaimed himself King of Wu and inaugurated a new era name, thus for the first time Wu officially claimed to be a sovereign state. Longyan died of illness in 922 and was succeeded by his brother, Xingmi's fourth son, Yang Pu. As before, Xu Wen had the real power. He prodded Yang Pu to proclaim himself emperor, but died in 927 before this could happen. 29 November 927 Yang Pu acceded the throne as Emperor of Wu. Xu Zhigao was made grand marshal and director of the Chancellery.

Territorial Extent
The Wu capital was at Guangling (present-day Yangzhou), and held present-day central and southern Anhui, central and southern Jiangsu, much of Jiangxi, and eastern Hubei.

End of the Kingdom
Xu Zhigao had been adopted by Xu Wen on Yang Xingmi's insistence and soon proved himself an able man. He came to power in Wu after his stepfather's death in 927 and continued to rule the state as governor of Jinling for some time. Finally in 937 he formally seized power for himself by proclaiming himself King of Qi and Yang Pu abdicated after suppressing the opposition of Yang Meng. Two years later, by claiming descent from a Tang prince Xu Zhigao and restoring his surname of Li, Xu Zhigao became Li Bian and proclaimed the restoration of the Tang. His state would be known to history as the Southern Tang.

Rulers
 904–905: Yáng Xíngmì 
 905–908: Yáng Wò 
 908–921: Yáng Lóngyǎn 
 921–937: Yáng Pǔ 

Wu and Southern Tang rulers family tree

See also
 Five Dynasties and Ten Kingdoms period

References

Citations

Sources

External links 
 http://www.chinaknowledge.de/History/Tang/rulers-wu.html

 
Five Dynasties and Ten Kingdoms
Former countries in Chinese history
907 establishments
10th-century establishments in China
930s disestablishments
10th-century disestablishments in China
States and territories established in the 900s
States and territories disestablished in the 930s
Wu (region)